KZWC (1570 AM) is a commercial radio station serving the Webster City, Iowa area. The station broadcasts a soft oldies format. KZWC is licensed to Fieldview Broadcasting LLC.

1570 AM is a Mexican clear-channel frequency on which XERF-AM is the dominant Class A station.

KZWC also provides regular news, weather and sports coverage.  A daily one-hour agricultural information called AgriTalk is locally produced and aired at 10 AM Monday through Friday.

According to the station's website, it began broadcasting on February 9, 1950, using the callsign KJFJ and was owned by the local newspaper, The Daily Freeman Journal. In 1971 the Go-Rich Corporation purchased KJFJ and combined it with KQWC-FM, changing the callsign.

The transmitter and broadcast tower are located on the east outskirts of Webster City on East 2nd Street.

On March 28, 2016, the station changed its call sign to KZWC.

Previous logos
 (KZWC logo under former "Magic 1570" branding)

References

External links

ZWC
Radio stations established in 1950
1950 establishments in Iowa
Oldies radio stations in the United States
Soft adult contemporary radio stations in the United States